Shenik is a former settlement and an abandoned village in the Aragatsotn Province of Armenia. It is 3 km east of the Mastara village, and is home to the 5th-century church of Surp Amenaprkich (Holy Saviour), and the 7th-century church of Surp Astvatsatsin (Holy Mother of God).

Gallery

References
Kiesling, Rediscovering Armenia, p. 19, available online at the US embassy to Armenia's website

Former populated places in Aragatsotn Province